Jason Rubin (born 1970) is an American video game director, writer, and comic book creator. He is best known for the Crash Bandicoot and Jak and Daxter series of games which were produced by Naughty Dog, the game development studio he co-founded with partner and childhood friend Andy Gavin in 1986. He was the president of THQ before its closure due to bankruptcy on January 23, 2013. Rubin is the vice president of Metaverse Content at Meta Platforms.

Career 
Rubin and Andy Gavin formed Naughty Dog in 1986. Later that year, they published their first game together — a budgetware title called Ski Crazed. In 1989, Rubin and Gavin sold their first game to Electronic Arts: a role-playing game called Keef the Thief.

While Gavin was an undergraduate in Haverford College and Rubin was attending the University of Michigan, they collaborated with each other on their next title: a role-playing game called Rings of Power. The game began as a PC title, but during meetings at Electronic Arts Gavin spotted a reverse engineered Sega Genesis, pitched a slightly modified version of the title to Trip Hawkins, and the title became the duo's first console game. Rings of Power still has a cult following today.

After much persuasion from Hawkins, Rubin and Gavin took a leap of faith and started designing Way of the Warrior, which was heavily inspired by Mortal Kombat, for the 3DO console. They demoed the game at CES and received interest from Skip Paul, former Chairman of Atari's Coin-Op division and then head of the new Universal Interactive Studios. Skip signed the pair to a three title development deal at Universal, moving them out to the Universal Studios lot and introducing them to Mark Cerny, who worked with the pair on the design of their next title, which was a "Donkey Kong Country-inspired" 3D platformer called Crash Bandicoot.

Crash Bandicoot turned out to be an enormous success, and Sony used the main character as their unofficial PlayStation mascot for several years. Due to the impressive visuals which the developer was able to achieve from the PlayStation console, the game served as a quality benchmark that all other game developers aimed to match, and the series spawned three sequels by Naughty Dog selling over 26 million units. The series continues with other development teams, having sold more than 40 million units worldwide.

After their success with Crash Bandicoot, Rubin and Gavin began working on Jak and Daxter, a franchise that sold 9 million units through the various Naughty Dog incarnations. The series continued with other developers and as of 2017 had sold 15 million copies sold worldwide. Before Jak and Daxter's release, Sony purchased Naughty Dog, which became a wholly owned subsidiary of Sony Computer Entertainment America in 2001. As a result, Jak and Daxter: The Precursor Legacy was developed exclusively for the PlayStation 2.

In their 18 years running Naughty Dog, they created fourteen original games including Math Jam (1985), Ski Crazed (1986), Dream Zone (1987), Keef the Thief (1989), Rings of Power (1991), Way of the Warrior (1994), Crash Bandicoot (1996), Crash Bandicoot 2: Cortex Strikes Back (1997), Crash Bandicoot: Warped (1998), Crash Team Racing (1999), Jak and Daxter: The Precursor Legacy (2001), Jak II (2003), Jak 3 (2004) and Jak X: Combat Racing (2005). Together these games have sold over 35 million units and generated over $1 billion in revenue.

Just days after making a controversial speech at 2004's D.I.C.E. Summit that criticized publishers for not recognizing and promoting talent responsible for creating games, Rubin publicly announced his departure from Naughty Dog.

On 29 May 2012, Rubin joined the struggling video game publisher THQ as president, and was responsible for all of THQ's worldwide product development, marketing and publishing operations. At the time Rubin joined THQ, the company had laid off hundreds of its employees  and the stock had lost over 99% of its value from its high.

According to Game Industry International, "placing Jason Rubin at the company's helm was unquestionably a good move — the Naughty Dog founder has an enviable track record and quite rightly commands the respect of the industry —, but by the time he took the role, THQ's stock had already crashed and layoffs were well underway. The company was mortally wounded; Rubin's failure to resuscitate his terminally ill patient should not reflect in any way on his own talents and abilities".

To save the teams and products management took the company through a restructuring. As part of that process, THQ filed for Chapter 11 with the intention to sell off its assets at auction.

Soon after, THQ management announced a stalking horse bid for the company by Clear Lake Capital for $60 million  Handling the sale of THQ was Centerview Partners  Skip Paul, a former colleague of Jason Rubin.

Creditors said the proposed sale of THQ in bankruptcy court benefited current THQ management, including Rubin. Early creditor objections and court documents were not kind to THQ management.  Though not as widely publicized as the initial criticism, Judge Walwrath put an end to the entire mismanagement line of argument when she called it a "conspiracy theory" on the record.  Additionally, same Creditors that made the initial accusations ultimately took the unusual step of releasing THQ Management, including Rubin, of any malfeasance in the company's Official Plan of Liquidation

Rubin's public statements made at the time are clear. Management was always open to, and actively seeking, higher bidders at the same time as they tried to hold the company together, both for the benefit of the Company and the Creditors:

Judge Mary F. Walrath decided to have an auction for the individual assets, and competing offers for the separate parts of THQ prevailed.  Though many employees lost their jobs in the bankruptcy, the development teams at Relic (bought by Sega), Volition (bought by Koch Media), and THQ Montreal (purchased by Ubisoft) remained intact, as did much of Vigil which became Crytek USA, and all of the THQ products in the works survived the bankruptcy have come or are scheduled to come out soon.

In December 2012, THQ partnered up with The Humble Bundle Team at Wolfire Games to make the Humble THQ Bundle raising over 5 million dollars, much of it going to charity. Rubin donated over $10,000 to charity as part of the event.

During E3 2014 it was announced that Rubin joined Oculus VR, heading up the Oculus first-party content initiatives in Seattle, San Francisco, Menlo Park, Dallas and Irvine.

In 2021, following Oculus parent company Facebook's rebranding as Meta, Rubin became VP of Metaverse Content, leading the company's VR and Metaverse Content production teams, the internal Studios, Publishing, and Developer Ecosystem teams.

Other projects 
Rubin also created two comic book series. The Iron Saint, originally known as Iron and the Maiden, was published by Aspen Comics, and including artwork designed by artists as Joe Madureira, Jeff Matsuda, Francis Manapul and Joel Gomez. "Mysterious Ways" was published by TopCow Comics and includes artwork from Tyler Kirkham.

Rubin also co-founded an Internet startup called Flektor with Naughty Dog co-founder Andy Gavin and former HBO executive Jason Kay. In May 2007, the company was sold to Fox Interactive Media, which is a division of News Corp. Fox described the company as: "a next-generation Web site that provides users with a suite of Web-based tools to transform their photos and videos into dynamic slideshows, postcards, live interactive presentations and video mash-ups."  In October 2007, Flektor partnered with its sister company, Myspace, and MTV to provide instant audience feedback via polls for the interactive MySpace / MTV Presidential Dialogues series with then-presidential candidate Senator Barack Obama.

Games

References 

University of Michigan alumni
American video game designers
Video game producers
American video game directors
Place of birth missing (living people)
20th-century American Jews
Jewish video game developers
American comics writers
1970 births
Living people
Video game writers
Video game businesspeople
Naughty Dog people
21st-century American Jews